Szarek  is a village in the administrative district of Gmina Ełk, within Ełk County, Warmian-Masurian Voivodeship, in northern Poland.

There is a fairly large family whose surname is associated with the name of the village, and the word szar means gray in Polish. It is unknown what the name "Szarek" really means.

References

Villages in Ełk County